The 1992 United States presidential election in Kansas took place on November 3, 1992, as part of the 1992 United States presidential election. Voters chose six representatives, or electors to the Electoral College, who voted for president and vice president.

Kansas was won by incumbent President George H. W. Bush (R-Texas) with 38.88% of the popular vote over Governor Bill Clinton (D-Arkansas) with 33.74%. Businessman Ross Perot (I-Texas) finished in third, with 26.99% of the popular vote. Kansas was surprisingly close, likely because Ross Perot split the vote. Had Clinton won in Kansas, it would have been a major upset victory. Clinton ultimately won the national vote, defeating incumbent President Bush and Perot. , this is the last election in which Kansas was decided by single digits and the last time that Ellis County, Cherokee County, Leavenworth County, Labette County, and Miami County voted for a Democratic presidential candidate, as well as the last election in which Wabaunsee County, Anderson County, Jefferson County, and Morris County (the four counties Perot either won or tied in) did not support the Republican candidate.

With 26.99% of the popular vote, Kansas would prove to be Perot's fifth-strongest state after Maine, Alaska, Utah and Idaho. Perot took third in the state overall but defeated Clinton or Bush for second place in 63 of Kansas’s 105 counties.

Results

Results by county

See also
 United States presidential elections in Kansas
 Presidency of Bill Clinton

Notes

References

Kansas
1992
1992 Kansas elections